Ming Cheng is a Professor of Electrical Engineering at Southeast University, Nanjing, China was named Fellow of the Institute of Electrical and Electronics Engineers (IEEE) in 2015 for contributions to the development and control of stator permanent magnet machines for vehicular propulsion and wind power generation.

References

External links

20th-century births
Living people
Chinese electrical engineers
Academic staff of Southeast University
Fellow Members of the IEEE
Year of birth missing (living people)
Place of birth missing (living people)